KHHS-LP (107.5 FM) was a radio station broadcasting a Christian radio format. Licensed to San Diego, California, United States, the station was owned by Horizon Christian Fellowship.

Horizon Christian Fellowship surrendered the station's license to the Federal Communications Commission (FCC) on June 19, 2015. The FCC cancelled KHHS-LP's license on June 22, 2015.

References

HHS-LP
HHS-LP
Radio stations established in 2006
Defunct radio stations in the United States
Radio stations disestablished in 2015
Defunct religious radio stations in the United States

2006_establishments_in_California 
2015 disestablishments in California
HHS-LP